Psilorhynchus nudithoracicus also known as the rainbow minnow is a freshwater ray-finned fish, a torrent minnow, which is found in the drainage systems of the Ganges and the Brahmaputra in India, Nepal and Bangladesh, as well as the Meghna River and Surma River drainage basins in India and Bangladesh. the habitat of this species is shallow running streams with sandy bottoms, usually with some pebbles laying on the sand.

References

Conway, K.W., D.E. Dittmer, L.E. Jezisek and H.H. Ng, 2013. On Psilorhynchus sucatio and P. nudithoracicus, with the description of a new species of Psilorhynchus from northeastern India (Ostariophysi: Psilorhynchidae). Zootaxa 3686(2):201-243.

Fish of Bangladesh
nudithoracicus
Taxa named by Raj Tilak
Taxa named by Akhlaq Husain
Fish described in 1980